Sonny Rollins and the Big Brass is an album by jazz saxophonist Sonny Rollins, recorded for the MetroJazz label, later reissued on Verve Records as Sonny Rollins/Brass - Sonny Rollins/Trio.

One side of the original LP featured performances by Rollins with a big band including  Nat Adderley, Reunald Jones, Ernie Royal, Clark Terry, Billy Byers, Jimmy Cleveland, Frank Rehak, Don Butterfield, Dick Katz, René Thomas and Roy Haynes, which was under the musical direction of Ernie Wilkins, and the other side had three tracks by Rollins' trio with Henry Grimes and Specs Wright and an unaccompanied solo performance.

Reception 

The Allmusic review by Ken Dryden states: "Big Brass is an appropriate name for the large ensemble arranged and conducted by Ernie Wilkins that accompanies the huge sound of Sonny Rollins. The energy within the leader's gospel-flavored shout 'Grand Street' is considerable, while a swinging but no less powerful version of George & Ira Gershwin's 'Who Cares' features a choice solo by guitarist Rene Thomas. Also added to this compilation are trio recordings with bassist Henry Grimes and drummer Specs Wright, including a brilliant leisurely stroll through 'Manhattan,' along with Rollins' tour de force unaccompanied tenor sax on 'Body and Soul'". Scott Yanow said "Rollins excels in both of these settings, making this an easily recommended set".

Track listing
 "Who Cares?" (Ira Gershwin, George Gershwin) – 3:55
 "Love Is a Simple Thing" (June Carroll, Arthur Siegel) – 3:00
 "Grand Street" (Sonny	Rollins) – 6:02
 "Far Out East" (Ernie	Wilkins) – 4:30
 "What's My Name?" (David Saxon, Robert Wells) – 3:44
 "If You Were the Only Girl in the World" (Nat Ayer, Clifford Grey) – 5:08
 "Manhattan" (Lorenz Hart, Richard Rodgers) – 4:28
 "Body and Soul" (Frank Eyton, Johnny Green, Edward Heyman, Robert Sour) – 4:17
Recorded at Beltone Recording Studios, NYC on July 10, 1958 (tracks 5-8) and Metropolitan Studios, NYC on July 11, 1958 (tracks 1-4)

Personnel
Sonny Rollins – tenor saxophone
Nat Adderley – cornet (tracks 1-4)
Reunald Jones, Ernie Royal, Clark Terry – trumpet (tracks 1-4)
Billy Byers, Jimmy Cleveland, Frank Rehak – trombone (tracks 1-4)
Don Butterfield – tuba (tracks 1-4)
Dick Katz – piano (tracks 1-4)
René Thomas – guitar (tracks 1-4)
Henry Grimes - bass – (tracks 1-7)
Roy Haynes (tracks 1-4), Specs Wright (tracks 5-7) – drums 
Ernie Wilkins – arranger, conductor (tracks 1-4)

References

1958 albums
Verve Records albums
Sonny Rollins albums
MetroJazz Records albums
Albums conducted by Ernie Wilkins
Albums arranged by Ernie Wilkins
Instrumental albums